Anna Viktorovna Astapenko (born 18 August 1984) is a retired Russian football defender, who most recently played for ShVSM Izmailovo in the Russian Championship. A former Under-19 international, she has played in the Champions League with Energiya Voronezh.

References

1984 births
Living people
Russian women's footballers
Russian Women's Football Championship players
Sportspeople from Krasnoyarsk
WFC Rossiyanka players
Ryazan-VDV players
SKA Rostov-on-Don (women) players
FC Energy Voronezh players
Nadezhda Noginsk players
CSP Izmailovo players
Women's association football defenders
20th-century Russian women
21st-century Russian women